Robin Anthony Fletcher  (30 May 1922 – 15 January 2016) was a British academic administrator, and a British field hockey player who competed in the 1952 Summer Olympics. He was a member of the British field hockey team which won the bronze medal. He played all three matches as forward.

Fletcher was a scholar of modern Greek who was a Fellow of Trinity College, Oxford, from 1950 to 1989, and later became an emeritus Fellow. Between 1951 and 1974 he combined the position of Domestic Bursar with a university lectureship in modern Greek. From 1980 to 1989 he served as Warden of Rhodes House, Oxford, responsible for the running of the Rhodes Scholarship. His memoirs, A Favouring Wind: A passage within and without academia, were published in 2007.  His wife Jinny died in July 2010. Portraits of Fletcher hang in Rhodes House, Oxford, and Trinity College, Oxford.

References

External links
 
Fletcher's profile at databaseOlympics

1922 births
2016 deaths
Wardens of Rhodes House
Fellows of Trinity College, Oxford
British male field hockey players
Olympic field hockey players of Great Britain
Field hockey players at the 1952 Summer Olympics
Olympic bronze medallists for Great Britain
Olympic medalists in field hockey
Officers of the Order of the British Empire
Recipients of the Distinguished Service Cross (United Kingdom)
Medalists at the 1952 Summer Olympics